Dauda may refer to:

 Dauda (given name)
 Dauda (surname)
 Dauda, Nepal, a village in Saptari District